Labour Party leadership elections were held in the following countries in 2011:

2011 New Zealand Labour Party leadership election
2011 Scottish Labour Party leadership election

See also
2011 Social Democratic and Labour Party leadership election